Leave a Light On may refer to:

 "Leave a Light On" (Belinda Carlisle song), 1989
 "Leave a Light On" (Tom Walker song), 2018
 "Leave a Light On" (Grey's Anatomy), a 2020 episode of the series
 "Leave a Light On", a 2021 song by Japanese Wallpaper
 Leave a Light On, a 2014 album by 7 Seconds

See also
 Leave the Light On (disambiguation)
 Leave Your Light On, a 2006 studio album by Aloud